Gmina Tarnogród is an urban-rural gmina (administrative district) in Biłgoraj County, Lublin Voivodeship, in eastern Poland.

Villages
Apart from the town of Tarnogród, Gmina Tarnogród contains the villages and settlements of Bolesławin, Cichy, Jamieńszczyzna, Kolonia Różaniecka, Luchów Dolny, Luchów Górny, Pierogowiec, Popówka, Różaniec, Różaniec-Szkoła, Wola Różaniecka and Zagrody.

Neighbouring gminas
Gmina Tarnogród is bordered by the gminas of Adamówka, Biszcza, Księżpol, Kuryłówka, Łukowa, Obsza and Stary Dzików.

References
Polish official population figures 2006

Tarnogrod
Biłgoraj County